The 1993–94 season was the 83rd season in Hajduk Split’s history and their third in the Prva HNL. Their 2nd place finish in the 1992–93 season meant it was their 3rd successive season playing in the Prva HNL.

Competitions

Overall record

Prva HNL

Classification

Results summary

Results by round

Results by opponent

Source: 1993–94 Croatian First Football League article

Matches

Croatian Football Super Cup

Source: hajduk.hr

Prva HNL

Source: hajduk.hr

Croatian Football Cup

Source: hajduk.hr

Cup Winners' Cup

Source: hajduk.hr

Player seasonal records

Top scorers

Source: Competitive matches

See also
1993–94 Croatian First Football League
1993–94 Croatian Football Cup

References

External sources
 1993–94 Prva HNL at HRnogomet.com
 1993–94 Croatian Cup at HRnogomet.com
 1993–94 European Cup Winners' Cup at rsssf.com

HNK Hajduk Split seasons
Hajduk Split
Croatian football championship-winning seasons